UUU, Uuu, or UuU may refer to:

 Uranium One (TSX: UUU, JSE: UUU), Canadian-based uranium mining company
 UUU, or uracil uracil uracil, the RNA codon for phenylalanine
 Unununium (Uuu), the former name of a chemical element now called Roentgenium (Rg)
 WUUU-FM, a country music outlet based out of Franklinton, Louisiana
 The Triple U Buffalo Ranch in Stanley county, South Dakota
 Triple U FM, Australian radio station
UUU, the production code for the 1973–74 Doctor Who serial The Time Warrior

See also
 You You You, an Alvin Stardust song
 You, You, You, a popular song recorded by the Ames Brothers in 1953
 Yuki Yuna Is a Hero, the Japanese anime series often abbreviated YuYuYu (結城友奈は勇者である, Yūki Yūna wa Yūsha de Aru)